Cuz I Love You is the third studio album and major label debut studio album by American singer and rapper Lizzo. It was released through Nice Life and Atlantic Records on April 19, 2019. The album features guest appearances from American rappers Missy Elliott and Gucci Mane. It spawned the singles "Juice" and "Tempo", the latter of which is a collaboration with Elliott. The deluxe edition of the album was released on May 3 and includes the Billboard Hot 100 number one single "Truth Hurts". The deluxe edition was nominated for Album of the Year at the 62nd Annual Grammy Awards, and won Best Urban Contemporary Album.

Background
The album is Lizzo's first release since her 2016 Coconut Oil EP. Lizzo stated at the album preview party at the Crazy Girls strip club in Hollywood on January 30 that she had been working on the album for three years. She also previewed a collaboration with Missy Elliott titled "Tempo" that appeared on the album. Along with the lead single "Juice", the album includes the "empowering dance track" "Like a Girl" and a song dedicated to an ex titled "Jerome".

Promotion
Lizzo announced the album in January 2019, and on February 13, shared the album's cover art, on which she appears nude. Paper called the cover a "stunning glow-up, and a transformation for Lizzo", going on to say that "Fat, and especially fat and Black bodies are rarely treated with such care by photographers, let alone on album covers that will sit on Target and Walmart shelves."

The album was supported by two concert tours: Cuz I Love You Tour (2019) and Cuz I Love You Too Tour (2019-2020).

Singles
"Juice" was released as the lead single from the record on January 4, 2019. The single became Lizzo's first commercial hit, entering component R&B charts in the United States, while also reaching the top twenty in Scotland. The single was promoted with Lizzo's debut television performance on The Ellen DeGeneres Show, and a later performance on The Tonight Show Starring Jimmy Fallon.

"Tempo", featuring American rap artist Missy Elliott was released as a single on July 26, 2019.  The song also was given a music video that premiered on YouTube the same date.

"Cuz I Love You", originally released as a promotional single on February 14, 2019, the song also was given a music video that premiered on YouTube the same date. Later, the song as released as a single to Top 40 radio on January 28, 2020.

Promotional singles
The album's title track was released as the first promotional single on February 14, 2019, alongside the song's music video. "Tempo" featuring Elliott was released as the album's second promotional single on March 20, 2019. "Tempo" went on to chart at number 21 on the US Digital Song Sales chart, Lizzo's first entry on a Billboard Hot 100 component chart.

Critical reception

Cuz I Love You received widespread acclaim from music critics upon its initial release. At Metacritic, which assigns a normalized rating out of 100 to reviews from mainstream critics, the album has an average score of 84, based on 24 reviews, indicating "universal acclaim".

Reviewing the album for AllMusic, Heather Phares praised Cuz I Love You as "a triumphant showcase for every part of Lizzo's talent, physicality and sexuality." Jumi Akinfenwa of Clash stated that by "Offering up a mix of pop, hip-hop, R&B and a sprinkling of trap and neo soul for good measure, Lizzo covers all bases and serves the perfect introduction to her world for mainstream audiences." DIY magazine's Rachel Finn gave a positive evaluation of the album, writing that "Lizzo's vibrant personality and humour shining through a set of tracks that switches through elements of funk, pop and R&B with ease."

In an article for NME, reviewer Natty Kasambala described the album as being "as flawlessly genre-spanning as Lizzo herself: pop at its core, but with constant references to her jazz roots and historical love of twerking." Claire Biddles at The Line of Best Fit shared similar sentiments, calling the album "Charming, addictive and seemingly effortless, Cuz I Love You is Lizzo's declaration of superstardom." Slant Magazines Zachary Hoskins concluded that "Lizzo's talent has always been evident, but this album's material, her strongest to date, allows her put it on full display. By the languorous, seductive neo-soul of closing track "Lingerie", her enthusiasm is as contagious as it is well-earned."

Some reviewers were more reserved in their assessments of the album. In a review for The Guardian, Alexis Petridis felt that "Lizzo has something to say, and a smart way of saying it ... but the potency of what's here would seem more potent still if it had been allowed a little room to breathe ... Instead, Cuz I Love You keeps its foot pressed down hard on the accelerator for half an hour in an attempt to ram-raid the charts." Rawiya Kameir was also critical in the review for Pitchfork, claiming that "Despite her obvious skill and charisma, some of the album's 11 songs are burdened with overwrought production, awkward turns of phrase, and ham-handed rapping."

Accolades

Awards and nominations

Commercial performance
Cuz I Love You debuted at number six on the Billboard 200 with 41,000 album-equivalent units, of which 24,000 were pure album sales. It was Lizzo's first album to chart on the Billboard 200. It then repeaked at number six on the charting week ending on June 27, 2019. It has stayed in the top 10 for 15 weeks after its release. The album peaked number 4 in its 19th week on the chart dated September 7, 2019.

Track listing
Songwriting credits adapted from BMI.

Notes
  signifies a co-producer.
  signifies an additional producer.
 "Water Me" contains elements from "I Am Free, No Dope for Me" written by Morris Wittenberg and from "My Home" written by Nneka Lucia Egbuna and Farhad Samadzada.

Personnel
Credits adapted from album's liner notes.

 Downtown Trevor Brown – co-producer (track 9)
 Harry Burr – mixing assistant (track 5)
 Clarence Coffee Jr. – additional vocals (track 14)
 Michael Cordone – trumpet (track 3)
 Scott Desmarais – mixing assistant (tracks 1-4, 6-11, 13)
 Missy Elliott – rap and additional vocals (track 7)
 Shaina Evoniuk – violin (track 11)
 Dan Farber – co-producer (track 7)
 Oak Felder – producer (tracks 2, 4, 9)
 Robin Florent – mixing assistant (tracks 1-4, 6-11, 13)
 Chris Galland – mix engineer (track 13)
 Chris Gehringer – mastering (tracks 1-4, 6-13)
 Gucci Mane – rap (track 8)
 Lemar Guillary – trombone (track 3)
 Victor Indrizzo – drums and percussion (track 3)
 Rouble Kapoor – assistant engineer (track 3)
 Zaire Koalo – co-producer (track 9)
 Joe LaPorta – mastering (track 5)
 Trevor Lawrence Jr. – drums (track 11)
 Lizzo – vocals (all tracks), producer (7), synthesizer (14), executive producer
 Bill Malina – engineer (tracks 3, 11)
 Manny Marroquin – mixing (tracks 1-4, 6-11, 13)
 Asha Maura – backing vocals (track 3)
 Andrew Maury – mixing (track 5)
 Jesse McGinty – saxophone (track 3)
 Nate Mercereau – producer (tracks 6, 11, 12), co-producer (7), additional production (3), engineer (6, 11), guitar and bass (3, 6, 11), keyboards (6, 11), instruments (7, 12), programming and drums (11)
 Sean Phelan – engineer (tracks 1, 5)
 Matthew Cerritos – assistant engineer (tracks 1, 5, 10)
 Ricky Reed – producer (tracks 3, 6, 7, 11-14), mixing (12), programming (3, 7, 11-14), keyboards and guitar (3), bass (3, 14), drums and synthesizer (14), instruments (7, 12)
 Mike Sabath – producer (track 8)
 Ethan Shumaker – engineer (tracks 3, 6, 7, 11-14), additional vocals (7)
 Keith "Daquan" Sorrells – assistant engineer (track 9)
 Shelby Swain – backing vocals (track 3), additional vocals (7)
 Sweater Beats – co-producer (track 7)
 Tele – co-producer and programming (track 13)
 Theron Thomas – backing vocals (track 3), additional vocals (7)
 Quinn Wilson – backing vocals (track 3)
 Tobias Wincorn – co-producer and programming (track 7), additional production (14)
 X Ambassadors – producers (tracks 1, 5, 10)

Charts

Weekly charts

Year-end charts

Decade-end charts

Certifications

Release history

Notes

References

2019 albums
Lizzo albums
Atlantic Records albums
Albums produced by Ricky Reed
Albums produced by Oak Felder
Grammy Award for Best Urban Contemporary Album
Funk albums by American artists
Soul albums by American artists
Rock albums by American artists